The Volvo 480 is a sporty compact car that was produced in Born, Netherlands, by Volvo from 1986 to 1995. It was the first front-wheel drive car made by Volvo and the only Volvo featuring pop-up headlights. The 480 was available in only one body style on an automobile platform related to the Volvo 440/460 five-door hatchback and four-door saloon models.

It features an unusual four-seat, three-door hatchback body, somewhere between liftback and estate in form. The 480 was marketed as a coupé in Europe starting in 1986. The car was originally intended to be marketed in the United States as a 2+2 "sports wagon" in the fall 1987, although these plans were cancelled due to the continued weakness of the U.S. dollar during 1987.

Development
Volvo took six years from the time the 480 was conceived, through its development, and finally brought to production readiness. The press launch was on October 15, 1985, but the 480 was first put on public show in March at the 1986 Geneva Motor Show, becoming available to buyers in May 1986.

Volvo described the car as a four seater with "sporty styling" and the first front wheel driven Volvo. The press described it as having a "sleek hatch body" in contrast to Volvo's traditional "boxcar look". The 480 was the first Volvo of its style since the P1800ES, and the last until the unveiling of the C30. All of these models featured a frameless glass hatch for cargo access.

The 480 was produced in Born, Netherlands, at the factory that built DAF cars, including the DAF 66 based Volvo 66, and later, the Volvo 300 Series. The 480 was the forerunner of the Volvo 440 and 460 models, which were built on the same platform.

Volvo also claimed that it was one of the first cars sold in Europe featuring bumpers designed to comply with United States National Highway Traffic Safety Administration (NHTSA) regulations to withstand a  front rear impact without damage to the engine, lights, and safety equipment.  The decision to incorporate pop-up headlights into the design was done to meet NHTSA standards on minimum headlight height while maintaining the aerodynamic shape. However, although it was foreseen to sell 25,000 cars overseas, the introduction of the Volvo 480 to the American market was postponed indefinitely in February 1988, citing unfavourable market conditions and the US dollar exchange rate.

The concept was to market a modern, compact front-wheel drive car with a unique low-slung design targeting buyers "between 25 and 40, probably with a higher than average education and with a career." Designed by Volvo's Dutch subsidiary, the "sporty 480 ES coupe" was introduced to change the automaker's "frumpy image" and into the "yuppie" market segment.

Volvo highlighted that the car was "well-endowed with advanced electronics" and the press release described in detail the numerous features. The 480 had good handling, due in part to its Lotus designed suspension. The normally aspirated Renault engines were reliable.

Special editions

Limited Edition (Paris blue)
In 1991, to mark the release of a new colour to the range, Paris Blue, Volvo offered a special edition 480. It featured turquoise bumper and trim inserts, as well as a unique interior, featuring two-tone turquoise and grey leather upholstery, speckled multicoloured carpet, and a MOMO leather steering wheel. It also received a front chin spoiler, 14-inch Atlas 5-spoke alloy wheels, and was only available from the factory with the naturally aspirated 1.7 catalysed engine.

Limited Edition (Two-Tone)
1992 saw the release of another Limited Edition (commonly referred to as the "Two-Tone"), which featured a distinctive green and silver two-tone metallic paint scheme, leather steering wheel, and a unique half leather interior. A lower chin spoiler and 15-inch Taurus 5-spoke alloy wheels were also standard until it was discontinued in 1993. Like the 'Paris blue' Limited Edition, the 'Two-Tone' Limited Edition was not limited to any specific production number.

GT
For the UK market in 1994, the GT was introduced as a strict run of 250 cars. It was available in two colours only; Racing Green Metallic and Flame Red Metallic. The all-leather interior was specially designed by an artist and featured a red, green, and brown printed pattern, which was unique to each car. The GT also featured Air-conditioning as standard, 15-inch multi-spoke Vesa alloys, and was only available with the 2.0 engine. The GT was sold outside of the UK, however, it was an option pack, not a standalone model, and did not feature the same interior or wheels as the UK models.

Celebration
1995 saw the United Kingdom release of the "Celebration" limited edition of 480 specially equipped and numbered cars. Celebrations were sold only in three colours, Dark Grey Metallic, Burgundy Metallic, and Satin White. A 6-disc CD changer, ruched leather interior, 15-inch 6-spoke Cetus alloy wheels, and air-conditioning were among the standard features found on the Celebration. The Celebration was sold as the 'Collection' in mainland Europe, also being a limited edition of a separate 480 examples.

Engines

{|class = wikitable
|-
!Engine code!!Type!! Power@rpm !! Torque@rpm !! Transmission
|-
|B18E
| F3N I4
|@5800
|@4000
|
 5-speed manual
|-
|B18EP/FP 
| F3N I4
|@5600
|@3900
|
 5-speed manual
 4-speed ZF 4HP14Q automatic
|-
|B20F
| F3R I4
|@5200
|@3500
|
 5-speed manual
 4-speed ZF 4HP14Q automatic
|-
|B18FT
| F3N I4|@5400
|@4500
|
 5-speed manual
 4-speed ZF 4HP14Q automatic
|}

Annual changes
The 1987 models were available with an anti-locking brake system (ABS) as an optional extra.

In 1991, the 480 received new mirrors, headrests for the back seats, as well as subtle modifications to the trim and body-coloured bumpers.

A four-speed automatic transmission was also offered.

1992 also saw the introduction of a new trim level called the '480 S'. This trim served as the base model and lacked certain features as standard that were found on the higher spec 'ES' models, such as alloy wheels, front fog lamps, and the semi-digital gauge cluster.

Also introduced was a total closure system whereby the key can be held in the lock position to close the windows and (where fitted) the sunroof. Earlier CEM modules feature a "passing" function for the wipers, whereby fully depressing the accelerator pedal will switch intermittent wipers to full.

In 1994, the 480 also received its last light update, and now sported clear front turn signals, stronger side intrusion bars, and a driver's airbag as standard. Production ended on 7 September 1995. According to the Volvo Museum, 76,375 Volvo 480s were made between 1986 and 1995.

Legacy
Writing about the demise of the 480 in Car Magazine'', journalist Richard Bremner wrote about the car's decent power and low weight combination. "This meant there was some danger of a sporty steer — pretty radical from a company that considered having fun at the wheel as acceptable as seducing a nun," he commented. "Good grief, a Volvo worth preserving. And there aren't many of them."

He also commented on the last versions for the United Kingdom as, "And Celebration it was too, as Europe waved goodbye to the badly built, pointless, DAF coupé with an outrageous asking price of £16,500. That paid for the CD player, alloys, leather, and a "pointless hallmarked plaque" glued to the dashboard." It "was no sports car" with most being "ridiculously underpowered" and available to collectors "at rock bottom" prices.

Prototypes 

The 480 factory also made several prototypes, including a 480 with an electric drivetrain, a supercharged version (G-Lader), a version with a sixteen-valve engine, and a version with a turbocharged 2.0 L engine. 

A convertible was announced to the press in the summer of 1987, but not seen in public until the 1990 Geneva Motor Show. It was planned to be launched at the beginning of 1991, but it did not make production after a supplier declared bankruptcy, and concerns over rollover safety protection. Several convertible prototypes survive.

References

External links

 Volvo 480 Club Europe

480
Compact cars
Hatchbacks
Front-wheel-drive vehicles
Cars of the Netherlands
Cars introduced in 1986
1990s cars
VDL Nedcar vehicles
Coupés
Cars discontinued in 1995